Naval Base is an coastal southwestern suburb of Perth, Western Australia, located within the City of Kwinana. It is a traditional industrial suburb in the Perth metropolitan region and contains a significant amount of heavy industry. It is named after the proposed and partially built Henderson Naval Base.

The Naval Base campus of South Metropolitan TAFE houses the Western Australian Defence Industry Workforce Office and the Naval Shipbuilding College.

References

External links

Suburbs of Perth, Western Australia
Suburbs in the City of Kwinana